Roozbeh or Rouzbeh is an old Persian male given name .The name consists of the words "rooz" (day) and "beh" (better) and it means "fortunate".

Persons named Roozbeh include:
Rhahzadh "Roch Vehan" (Rōzbehān), son of a certain Rōzbeh.
Rouzbeh (died 653/656), given name of Salman the Persian.
Rōzbeh aka Ibn al-Muqaffa' (died 756/757), Persian author.
Khosro Roozbeh (1915–1958), Iranian activist.
Roozbeh Farahanipour (born 1971), Iranian writer.
Roozbeh Mirebrahimi (born 1978), Iranian journalist and blogger.
Roozbeh Aliabadi (born 1984), Iranian-American Political & Economic Advisor.
Rouzbeh Yassini, Iranian-American engineer.
Roozbeh Pournader, Iranian-American free software activist.

References